Maureen Dale Jacobson (born 7 December 1961) is a former association football player who represented New Zealand.

Club career
Jacobsen played in England with Millwall Lionesses and was part of their FA Women's Cup winning team in 1991. She also won the Finnish Naisten SM-sarja championship with HJK Helsinki in 1988.

International career
Jacobson made her full Football Ferns debut in a 2–2 draw with Australia 6 October 1979. She went on to become New Zealand's second most capped female player with 60 caps and 20 goals to her credit.

Jacobson  represented New Zealand at the Women's World Cup finals in China in 1991 playing all 3 group games; a 0–3 loss to Denmark, a 0–4 loss to Norway and a 1–4 loss to China.

References

External links

1961 births
Living people
New Zealand women's international footballers
New Zealand women's association footballers
1991 FIFA Women's World Cup players
Millwall Lionesses L.F.C. players
Expatriate women's footballers in Finland
FA Women's National League players
Helsingin Jalkapalloklubi (women) players
New Zealand expatriate women's association footballers
New Zealand expatriate sportspeople in England
Kansallinen Liiga players
Women's association football midfielders
Expatriate women's footballers in England
New Zealand expatriate sportspeople in Finland